Won Gyun (12 February 1540 – 27 August 1597) was a Korean general and admiral during the Joseon Dynasty. He is best known for his campaigns against the Japanese during Hideyoshi's invasions of Korea. Won was a member of Wonju Won family, which was well known for its members' military accomplishments. He was born in 1540 near Pyeongtaek and demonstrated his skill as warrior at a young age. He was qualified as a military officer and was first assigned to the northern border to defend against the Jurchens, who frequently raided Korean villages. Won led many successful campaigns with Yi Il and Yi Sun-sin against the Jurchens. After considerable accomplishments on the northern frontier, he was promoted to admiral in 1592 and sent to the southern coast of Gyeongsang Province to command the province's Western Fleet, along with Yi Sun-sin, who became admiral before Won and took command of Jeolla Province's Eastern Fleet. At the time, Won and Yi were cavalry leaders who had no experience with naval warfare.

Military career 
Upon passing the qualification exam, he was assigned to the northern border to defend against the Jurchens, who frequently raided Korean villages. Won led successful campaigns along with Yi Il and Yi Sun-sin against the Jurchens. He was promoted to admiral in 1592 and sent to the southern coast of Gyeongsang Province to command the province's Eastern Fleet, with Yi Sun-sin, who became admiral before Won and took command of Jeolla Province's Western Fleet. At the time, Won and Yi were cavalry leaders who had no experience with naval warfare.

Before the Japanese invasion 
Japan had just united after a long period of internal warfare by a new leader, Toyotomi Hideyoshi, who had become supreme ruler over most of Japan by killing and co-opting many rivals to rise to power. He decided to begin an expansionist war against Japan's neighbors, beginning with Joseon as the first step to China, then under the Ming Dynasty. Some Koreans realized that the threat from Japan was great and argued that the Joseon dynasty needed to prepare for invasion from Japan as well as the existing Jurchen menace. However, the government was divided along factional lines, and officials could not reach a decision.

First wave of Japanese invasion 
On April 13, 1592, the Japanese fleet, under Katō Kiyomasa, launched a sudden strike on the Eastern Fleet of Gyeongsang province and disabled every ship under its control. The main army under Kato and Konishi Yukinaga landed on the Korean Peninsula the next day and marched northward. Won, the commander of the Eastern Fleet of Gyeongsang Province, was also routed by the invading Japanese. (Won's predecessor was able to pass a fleet combat readiness inspection just one year before the war.) With the able force, Admiral Won may have had an opportunity to intercept and engage Japanese invading forces at sea, thus perhaps preventing or delaying the Japanese incursion on Korean soil. However, he decided not to act upon the naval intelligence regarding the Japanese incursion until the Japanese landing party had established a beachhead and successfully laid siege upon the city of Busan.

At that point, Won sank many of his ships in retreat to ensure they would not be captured by invading Japanese forces. With four ships left under his command, Won called for help from Yi Sun-sin, who had prepared for war and raised a smaller and battle ready fleet. King Seonjo finally ordered both admirals to fight against the Japanese forces on May 2, 1592. Won and Yi began their campaign two days later, with Admiral Yi Eok Ki, the commander of the Eastern Fleet of Jeolla Province who later became the commander of the Western Fleet of the same Province following Yi's promotion.

On May 7, the Korean navy under Yi destroyed a Japanese fleet in the Battle of Okpo. Later, Won was promoted to an army general, and Yi became naval chief of staff.

Plot to remove Yi Sun-sin 
In 1597, the Japanese decided to stop all negotiations with the Koreans and Chinese Ming Dynasty and planned a re-invasion of Korea. To do so, they plotted to remove Admiral Yi Sun-sin from his position. Japanese spies directed by Konishi Yukinaga spread word that Katō Kiyomasa was urging other Japanese to continue fighting and would soon be crossing the sea. King Seonjo ordered Admiral Yi to capture Kato, but Yi refused to do so, as he knew that the words were the fabrications of Japanese agents.

Seonjo was in fear of a possible coup d'état attempt by Yi or by his supporters, which was never plotted, but Seonjo convinced himself it could happen any day: Yi refused to carry out his orders several times and his fleet was the strongest combat force on both sides. Yi refused to carry out the orders purely due to tactical reasons, but the act of insubordination itself, no matter how justifiable, frightened the King beyond his breaking point. King Seonjo finally ordered the execution of Yi, but the royal court reluctantly yet successfully resisted the order and was able to lower the punishment to imprisonment and demotion. Yi was placed under the command of Gwon Yul to recover from his wounds from the torture administered during the investigation of the charges against him. Seonjo then replaced Yi with Won Gyun as the naval chief of staff.

Battle of Chilcheonryang — Won Gyun's first and last naval engagement
Won also knew the information was false and did not advance toward Busan for the same tactical reasons Yi reported to the royal court before his removal from the post. Yi was removed for refusing orders to engage the Japanese. The government continued to trust the information and ordered Won to attack Japanese ships at Ungchŏn. Won attacked the Japanese — who were mostly unarmed and protected under the cease-fire treaty to support the negotiation process which was about to be terminated — and defeated them. He lost one of his battleships and its captain during the attack. He did not advance after receiving a letter of protest from the Japanese commander. Then Field Marshal Gwon Yul, who was also under heavy pressure from the king, recalled Won to his headquarters and once again ordered him to attack Busan. Won finally led the navy towards Busan, along with the famous admiral Yi Eok Ki, following orders despite tactical considerations. 
 
The Japanese at first seemed to retreat, but it was a trap. The Japanese were prepared to devastate the Joseon navy before land invasion. The number of Japanese ships was so great that most Koreans were already frightened, including Admiral Bae Seol. The Japanese fleet, commanded by Todo Takatora, advanced toward Won Gyun's fleets. Won knew that he would lose the battle but had no choice but to engage.

At the Battle of Chilchonryang, most of Joseon Navy's ships were destroyed. Won was considered to be killed in action while running away, when his brother was killed during this battle. Only the small detachment of twelve warships under the command of admiral Bae Sŏl — who refused to participate and fled even before the battle began — survived. Every other ship in the combat was destroyed or disabled, along with almost all of Joseon navy line officers and many capable mid-level commanders.

Aftermath 
The battle opened the route for Japanese to advance to Yellow Sea, and Todo set up the plan to attack Hanyang from land and sea with Katō Kiyomasa and Konishi Yukinaga. However, Japan's hopes were crushed again by Yi Sun-sin's return at the Battle of Myeongnyang, which would decide the winner of the devastating war. Despite any historical controversy, Won Gyun and Yi Sun-sin received commendations following their deaths.

Legacy 
Next to his military career, Won Gyun is perhaps best known for his personal faults, which included excessive alcohol consumption and attempts at adultery. In his War Diaries, Yi Sun-Sin recalls reports and rumors about "cruel deeds" committed by Won and even mentions an incident in which Won had unsuccessfully attempted to seduce one of his subordinates's wife, calling him a "wicked man" and (at least partially) blaming him for his degradation ("Won employs all means to entrap me").

Much controversy lingers in regard to Won Gyun as a military leader. Widely panned by scholars and historians, there is recent research to suggest that Won Gyun may have been excessively vilified during the Park Chung-Hee administration to elevate Yi Sun-sin by juxtaposition. In particular, Won Gyun's earlier successes against the Jurchens have been buried and there is an interest in providing a more objective view of Won Gyun's military career.

While fault exists for Won Gyun's mistakes as a naval officer, much of the blame of the troubles during that period lies in the factionalized incompetence of the royal court. However, it is still hard to ignore his actions and lack of competency as a naval commander, and blame the political instability and indecision of the royal court for the result of the battle of Chilcheonryang. The battle led to the near-complete annihilation of the Korean navy in a single engagement against the Japanese, who were heretofore unable to prevail against the Koreans in a naval engagement. Some explain his legacy of poor command to be an unfortunate byproduct of comparison to his more successful associate, Yi Sun-sin.

Family
Parents
Father: Won Jun-ryang (원준량), Internal Prince Pyeongwon (평원부원군)
Mother: Lady Yang, of the Namwon Yang clan (남원 양씨), daughter of Yang Huijeung (양희증)
Wives and issues:
Lady Yun, of the Papyeong Yun clan (파평 윤씨; 1546 – 16 September 1642)
Won Saung (원사웅;b.1575), first son
Daughter-in-law: Lady Gu of the Neungseong Gu clan (능성구씨), daughter of Gu Samrak (구삼락)
Grandson: Won Pil (원필)
Daughter-in-law: Lady Seong of, the Changnyeong Seong Clan (창녕 성씨)
Grandson: Won Yeom (원염)
Lady Won, of the Wonju Won clan (원주원씨), first daughter
Son-in-law: Han Eok (한억)

In popular culture

Film and television
 Portrayed by Choi Jae-sung in the 2004-2005 KBS1 TV series Immortal Admiral Yi Sun-sin.
 Portrayed by Son Hyun-joo in the 2022 film Hansan: Rising Dragon.

Comics
In Yi Soon Shin: Warrior and Defender, as one of Yi's adversaries.

Video games
In the Admiral Yi campaign of the video game Empires: Dawn of the Modern World, Won Gyun is portrayed as a traitor to Korea, allying first with Manchu raiders harassing Korea's north and later with the Japanese invaders. In this portrayal, Won Gyun appears to be responsible for masterminding both attacks on Korea, with the eventual aim of becoming King of a reduced Korea, allied to Japan and tributary to Ming China. His treachery is discovered by Ryu Seong-ryong, and he is arrested.

See also
History of Korea
Naval history of Korea
 Hideyoshi's invasions of Korea

References

Notes
Yi Sun-sin, Nanjung Ilgi [The War Diary], eds. Ha Tae-hung and Sohn Pow-key. Seoul: Yonsei University Press. 1977.
Sadler, A.L. “The Naval Campaign in the Korean War of Hideyoshi, 1592-1598.” In Transactions of the Asiatic Society of Japan, ser. 2, vol. 14, June 1937, pp. 178–208.
Underwood, Horace Horton. “Korean Boats and Ships.”  In Transactions of the Royal Asiatic Society, Korea Branch, Seoul, vol. 23, pp. 1–89, 1934.
Park, Yun-hee. Yi Sun-sin. Seoul: Hanjin. 1978.

1540 births
1597 deaths
Korean admirals
People of the Japanese invasions of Korea (1592–1598)
Korean generals
Korean military personnel killed in action
16th-century Korean people
Wonju Won clan
People from Pyeongtaek